Giovanni Tonoli (22 April 1947 – 25 June 1993) was an Italian cyclist. He competed in the team time trial at the 1972 Summer Olympics.

References

External links
 

1947 births
1993 deaths
Italian male cyclists
Olympic cyclists of Italy
Cyclists at the 1972 Summer Olympics
Cyclists from Milan